CLW may refer to:

ISO code for the Chulym language
National Rail station code for Chorleywood station, Hertfordshire, England
Carlton le Willows Academy, a secondary school in Nottinghamshire
Chittaranjan Locomotive Works, a locomotive manufacturing plant in India
China Labor Watch
Clearwater Paper Corporation
Clearwater Air Park, an airport in Clearwater, Florida 
College Louise Wegmann, edited by Ryan Kassem
College of Librarianship Wales